Paradusta hungerfordi, common name Hungerford's cowry, is a species of sea snails, marine gastropod mollusks in the family Cypraeidae, the cowries.

Description
Paradusta hungerfordi has a pear-shaped shell reaching a size of 20 – 48 mm, with a quite variable coloration and pattern. Usually the dorsum surface is pale brown or whitish with brown dots, while the ventral surface may be whitish, yellowish or also orange.

Distribution
This species can be found around Japan and in the northeastern coast of Australia.

Subspecies
 Paradusta hungerfordi bealsi (Mock, 1996) 
 Paradusta hungerfordi coucoumi (Schilder, 1964)
 Paradusta hungerfordi hungerfordi (Sowerby III, 1888)
 Paradusta hungerfordi lovetha (Poppe, Tagaro & Buijse, 2005)

Gallery

References

 Sowerby G. B. III. (1888). Description of sixteen new species of shells. Proceedings of the Zoological Society of London. (1888): 207-213, pl. 11
 WoRMS
 Biolib
 
 Lorenz F. (2017). Cowries. A guide to the gastropod family Cypraeidae. Volume 1, Biology and systematics. Harxheim: ConchBooks. 644 pp. 
 Liu J.Y. [Ruiyu] (ed.). (2008). Checklist of marine biota of China seas. China Science Press. 1267 pp.

External links
 Flmmh.ufl
 Beautiful Cowries
 Conchology
  Petit, R. E. (2009). George Brettingham Sowerby, I, II & III: their conchological publications and molluscan taxa. Zootaxa. 2189: 1–218

Cypraeidae
Gastropods described in 1888